Peter Dalglish  (born May 20, 1957) is the Canadian founder of the Street Kids International charity and a convicted child sex offender. Until 2015, he was the Country Representative for UN-Habitat in Afghanistan. He is currently serving an 8 year prison in Nepal after being convicted of raping two young boys.

Early life
Dalglish was born in London, Ontario. He later attended Upper Canada College in Toronto. He graduated from Stanford University and then from Dalhousie Law School in 1983. Dalglish was called to the Bar in 1985.

Work
Dalglish organized an airlift of food and medical supplies from Canada to Ethiopia in December 1984. The experience convinced him to leave his law career and return to Africa to work with poor children. Dalglish joined the World University Service of Canada (WUSC) to work in Darfur, where he organized humanitarian relief for women and children displaced by severe drought and famine.

In 1986, Dalglish was reassigned to run the World Food Programme Road Transportation Operation in Khartoum. Dalglish convinced a Belgian technical training school to provide auto mechanic training to street children, funded by Bob Geldof of Band Aid.

In 1986, Dalglish set up a bicycle courier service run entirely by street children in Khartoum. With several borrowed bikes, he established Street Kids International. The initial profits enabled the organization to purchase more bikes.

Dalglish served for some time as executive secretary to Youth Services Bureau of Ottawa, which helps out-of-work Canadian youth. In 1994, Dalglish was appointed as the first director of Youth Service Canada, the Government of Canada's civilian volunteer youth corps. In 2002 Dalglish was selected as the chief technical adviser for the UN's child labour program in Nepal. In this role, he focused on three initiatives: return children from orphanages to their families; treat children affected by HIV/AIDS, and apprenticeship training.

In the late 1980s, Dalglish through Street Kids International arranged to rehabilitate and equip children's schools in southern Sudan as part of Operation Lifeline and hired Emma McCune to run the project. Between 2006 and 2010, Dalglish served as the executive director of the South Asia Children's Fund, which promotes education for disadvantaged children in the region.

Dalglish served as Senior Advisor and Deputy Chief of Party for UN-Habitat in Kabul, Afghanistan October 2010–December 2014. In December 2014, he became Chief of Party until the end of his mission in July 2015. Following his Afghanistan mission, Dalglish joined the UN Mission for Ebola Emergency Response.

Recognition

In December 2016, Dalglish was named a Member of the Order of Canada.

Child rape conviction 
On April 8, 2018, Dalglish was arrested by Nepal Police from Kavre District on allegations of child rape. After weeks of investigation, Nepal's Central Investigation Bureau (CIB) confirmed that Dalglish had been charged with raping two boys aged 12 and 14. Dalglish has denied the charges. On June 10, 2019, he was found guilty. On July 8, 2019 he was sentenced to prison, though news reports vary on the length of his term.

Daglish appealed the conviction, but lost his appeal in January 2020, when the Patan High Court, while reducing the jail sentence from 9 to 8 years, upheld the conviction.

References

1957 births
Canadian founders
Canadian humanitarians
Canadian people convicted of child sexual abuse
Child abuse incidents and cases
Child sexual abuse in Nepal
Living people
Members of the Order of Canada
People from London, Ontario
Rape in the 2010s
Schulich School of Law alumni
Stanford University alumni
Upper Canada College alumni
Violence against men in Asia